Quinton Byfield (born August 19, 2002) is a Canadian professional ice hockey centre for the  Los Angeles Kings of the National Hockey League (NHL). Byfield was selected second overall by the Kings in the 2020 NHL Entry Draft and made his NHL debut with the team in 2021.

Playing career
Byfield was the first overall pick in the 2018 OHL Draft and won both OHL Rookie of the Year and CHL Rookie of the Year. In 2018–19, he put up 29 goals and 61 points in 64 games.

After his second overall selection in the 2020 NHL Entry Draft, Byfield was signed by the Los Angeles Kings to a three-year, entry-level contract on October 16, 2020. He was assigned to the Kings' American Hockey League (AHL) roster to begin the 2020–21 season where he played on a line with Akil Thomas and Devante Smith-Pelly. His line became the first all-Black line in professional ice hockey since Herb Carnegie, Ossie Carnegie, and Manny McIntyre in the 1940s. During their first game together, Thomas recorded a natural hat-trick and his line combined for six points in the eventual win. On April 28, 2021, Byfield made his NHL debut in a 3–2 loss to the Anaheim Ducks. He recorded his first NHL point on May 5, 2021, in a 4–2 win over the Arizona Coyotes.

In October 2021, Byfield fractured his ankle, keeping him from joining the Kings. Byfield eventually returned to the NHL level on January 20, 2022. He scored his first NHL goal in a matchup against the New York Islanders on January 27, in a 3–2 win over the New York Islanders.

International play

 

Byfield won a silver medal at the 2019 Hlinka Gretzky Cup. Byfield won a Gold Medal with Canada at the 2020 World Junior Championships held in the Czech Republic, posting one assist in seven games. Byfield won a silver medal with Canada at the 2021 World Junior Championships held in Canada, posting two goals and five assists for seven points in seven games.

Career statistics

Regular season and playoffs

International

Awards and honours

References

External links
 

2002 births
Living people
Black Canadian ice hockey players
Canadian ice hockey centres
Canadian people of Jamaican descent
Los Angeles Kings draft picks
Los Angeles Kings players
National Hockey League first-round draft picks
Ontario Reign (AHL) players
Sportspeople from Newmarket, Ontario
Sudbury Wolves players